Arkaliospilio is a cave located to the south west of Marathos. The entrance is 2.1 meters wide and 1 meter high. A large part of this cave is still unexplored.

Roman, Byzantine and Medieval conches have been found inside the cave.

It was used as a shelter for the Christians during the Turkish occupation.

References

Caves of Greece
Landforms of Crete
Tourist attractions in Crete